The  is an animation award given at the Mainichi Film Awards. It is named after Japanese animator Noburō Ōfuji.

History
Following the death of pioneering animator Noburō Ōfuji in 1961, Mainichi established a new award in his honour to recognise animation excellence. A specialist in silhouette animation, Ōfuji was one of the earliest Japanese animators to gain international recognition, winning accolades at the 1952 Cannes Film Festival and the 1956 Venice Film Festival.

With the growth of the animation industry in Japan, the award in the 1980s came to be dominated by big budget studio productions, over the work of the independent animators for whose efforts it was originally established. To address this concern, the Animation Grand Award was established to reward large scale cinematic animation, enabling the Ōfuji award to focus on shorter pieces again.

The award encompasses a much wider variety of animation than many western anime fans would consider. As well as being an adaptation of the Ernest Hemingway novel, The Old Man and the Sea is the winning work of Russian animator Aleksandr Petrov.

Winners
1962 -   by Osamu Tezuka
1963 - Wanpaku Ōji no Orochi Taiji by Yugo Serikawa/Toei Doga
1964 - Murder (殺人 MURDER) by Makoto Wada
1965 - Love (愛 Ai) by Yoji Kuri and The Mysterious Medicine (ふしぎなくすり Fushigi na Kusuri) by Tadanari Okamoto
1966 - Pictures at an Exhibition (展覧会の絵 Tenrankai no E) by Osamu Tezuka
1967 - Two Pikes (二匹のサンマ Ni-Hiki no Sanma) and The Room (部屋 Heya) by Yoji Kuri
1968 - The Ugly Duckling (みにくいあひるのこ Minikui Ahiru no Ko) by Gakken
1969 - Yasashii Lion (やさしいライオン) by Mushi Production
1970 - The Flower and the Mole (花ともぐら Hana to Mogura) and Home My Home (ホーム・マイホーム) by Tadanari Okamoto
1971 - Tenma no Torayan (てんまのとらやん) by Video Tokyo
1972 - Oni (鬼) by Kihachirō Kawamoto
1973 - Praise Be to Small Ills (南無一病息災 Nanmu Ichibyousokusai) by Tadanari Okamoto
1974 - A Poet's Life (詩人の生涯 Shijin no Shougai) by Kihachirō Kawamoto
1975 - The Water Seed (水のたね Mizu no Tane) by Tadanari Okamoto
1976 - Dojoji Temple (道成寺 Dojoji) by Kihachirō Kawamoto
1977 - Towards the Rainbow (虹に向かって Miji ni Mukatte) by Tadanari Okamoto
1978 - Not awarded
1979 - The Castle of Cagliostro
1980 - Speed (スピード) by Taku Furukawa
1981 - Gauche the Cellist
1982 - The Magic Ballad (おこんじょうるり) by Tadanari Okamoto
1983 - Barefoot Gen
1984 - Nausicaä of the Valley of the Wind
1985 - Night on the Galactic Railroad
1986 - Castle in the Sky
1987 - Legend of the Forest Part 1 (森の伝説) by Osamu Tezuka
1988 - My Neighbor Totoro
1989 - Not awarded
1990 - Briar Rose, or The Sleeping Beauty (いばら姫、またはねむり姫 Ibarahime Mata wa Nemurihime) by Kihachirō Kawamoto
1991 - The Restaurant of Many Orders (注文の多い料理店 Chuumon no Ooi Ryouriten) by Tadanari Okamoto/Kihachirō Kawamoto
1992 - Not awarded
1993 - Ginga no Uo ~Ursa Minor Blue~ (銀河の魚 ~URSA minor BLUE~) by Shigeru Tamura
1994 - Not awarded
1995 - Memories (「MEMORIES」大友克洋) by Katsuhiro Ōtomo
1996 - Rusuban (るすばん) by N&G Production
1997 - Not awarded
1998 - Mizu no Sei Kappa Hyakuzu (水の精河童百図) by Shirokumi
1999 - Rōjin to Umi - The Old Man and the Sea (「老人と海」アレクサンドル・ペトロフと技術スタッフ) by Aleksandr Petrov
2000 - Blood: The Last Vampire by Hiroyuki Kitakubo/Production I.G
2001 - Kujira Tori (くじらとり) by Studio Ghibli
2002 - Millennium Actress (千年女優 Sennen Joyū) by Satoshi Kon/Madhouse
2003 - Winter Days (冬の日 Fuyu no Hi)
2004 - Mind Game (マインド・ゲーム) by Masaaki Yuasa/Studio 4°C
2005 - tough guy! by Shintarō Kishimoto
2006 -  by Michael Arias/Studio 4°C
2007 - A Country Doctor (カフカ　田舎医者) by Kōji Yamamura
2008 - Ponyo (崖の上のポニョ, Gake no Ue no Ponyo) by Hayao Miyazaki/Studio Ghibli
2009 - Denshin-Bashira Elemi no Koi by Hideto Nakata/Sovat Theater
2010 - Not awarded
2011 - 663114 by Isamu Hirabayashi
2012 - Combustible (火要鎮) by Katsuhiro Ōtomo
2013 - The Moon That Fell Into the Sea (海に落ちた月の話) by Akira Oda
2014 - Crazy Little Thing (澱みの騒ぎ) by Onohana
2015 - Datum Point (水準原点) by Ryo Orikasa
2016 - In This Corner of the World (この世界の片隅に) by Sunao Katabuchi
2017 - Lu Over the Wall (夜明け告げるルーのうた) by Masaaki Yuasa
2018 - Liz and the Blue Bird (リズと青い鳥) by Naoko Yamada
2019 - A Japanese Boy Who Draws (ある日本の絵描き少年) by Masanao Kawajiri
2020 - On-Gaku: Our Sound (音楽) by Kenji Iwaisawa
2021 - Pukkulapottas and Hours in the Forest (プックラポッタと森の時間) by Takeshi Yashiro
2022 - Inu-Oh (犬王) by Masaaki Yuasa

See also

 List of animation awards

References

Anime awards
Lists of anime films
Awards established in 1962
1962 establishments in Japan
Ōfuji Noburō Award
Lists of films by award